Chloropropanols are chlorohydrins related to propanols containing chloride functional group.  Eight isomers are possible. Two of these derivatives, 1,3-dichloropropanol (1,3-DCP) and 3-chloropropane-1,2-diol (3-MCPD), are carcinogenic contaminants in processed foods.  Several isomers are encountered in industrial chemistry.

Monochloropropanols:
 2-Chloro-1-propanol
 3-Chloro-1-propanol
 1-Chloro-2-propanol

Dichloropropanols:
 1,2-Dichloropropanol
 1,3-Dichloropropanol (1,3-DCP)

Chloropropanediols:
 3-Chloropropane-1,2-diol (3-MCPD)
 2-Chloropropane-1,3-diol